El Trabuco Venezolano - Vol. III is a vinyl LP by Venezuelan musician Alberto Naranjo, originally released in 1981 and partially rereleased in two CD albums titled El Trabuco Venezolano 1977 - 1984 Vol. 1 (1994) and Vol. 2 (1995). It is the third of seven albums (two live albums) of the El Trabuco Venezolano musical project arranged and directed by Naranjo.

Track listing

Personnel
 Alberto Naranjo - drums, arranger, director on all tracks;timbales on 4, 5, 6
 Samuel del Real - piano on all tracks
 Lorenzo Barriendos - bass guitar on all tracks, except on 2
 José Velázquez - bass guitar on 2
 Frank Hernández - timbales on 3
 Felipe Rengifo - congas; Afro Venezuelan percussion on 1, 2; Batá drum (Iyá) on 5
 Jesús Quintero - bongos on 4, 6; Afro Venezuelan percussion on 1, 2
 Luisito Quintero - bongos on 1, 3, 5; Batá drum (Okónkolo) on 5
 Carlos Quintero - Afro Venezuelan percussion on 1, 2
 Manuel Urbina - Bata drums (Itótele) on 5
 Luis Arias - trumpet on all tracks, except on 1, 6
 Gustavo Aranguren - trumpet on all tracks, except on 1; flugel horn on 7
 José Díaz F. - trumpet on 2, 4, 5, 8; flugel horn on 7
 Luis Lewis Vargas - trumpet on 2, 4, 5, 8;  flugel horn on 7
 Pablo Armitano - trumpet on 3, 8; flugel horn on 7
 Elías Guerra - trumpet on 3, 5, 8
 Rafael Silva - trombone on all tracks, except on 1, 8
 Leopoldo Escalante - trombone on 2, 4
 Carlos Espinoza - trombone on 2
 Onésimo García - trombone on 3, 4, 5, 7
 Mauricio Silva - trombone on 3, 5, 7, 8
 Alejandro Pérez Palma - trombone on 6, 8
 Oscar Mendoza - bass trombone on 8
 Carlos Daniel Palacios - lead singer on 4, 5 and chorus
 Moisés Daubeterre - lead singer on 3, 7 and chorus
 Carlos Espósito - lead singer on 6 and chorus
 Joe Ruiz - lead singer on 2 and chorus

Guest musicians 
 Cecilia Todd - lead singer on 1
 Grecia Garrett - vocals on 7
 Carolina Landaeta - vocals on 7
 Rosalía Quintero - vocals on 7
 Grupo Guaco on 8; Gustavo Aguado - lead singer
 Angel Melo - Venezuelan cuatro on 1, 2
 Gerardo Alonzo - trumpet on 6
 Carlos de León - trumpet on 6
 César Monge - trombone on 6
 Carlos Guerra (Jr) - trombone on 6

Technical personnel 
 Executive producer: Orlando Montiel
 Musical director and associate producer: Alberto Naranjo
 Staff coordinator: Freddy Sanz
 Cover design: Santiago Pol and Orlando Montiel, realized by Vibra-Crom C. A.
 Photos: Filippo Billoti (cover), Oscar Booy, César Salazar, Fernando Sánchez
 Label: YVKCT con músiC.A. in association with Integra C. A. YVLP-013
 Print: Gastello
 Place of Recording: Estudios Sono Dos Mil
 Recording engineer: Ricardo Landaeta - Ignacio Rojas (assistant)
 Produced in Caracas, Venezuela, 1981

External links
Anapapaya.com
Salsa2u.com
Venciclopedia.com

1981 albums
Alberto Naranjo albums